Joel Morrison (born 1976, Seattle, Washington) is an American sculptor.

Morrisons' work was shown in the California Biennial at the Orange County Museum of Art in 2006, and in the Thing exhibition at the Hammer Museum in Los Angeles. In 2010 his Six Solos were shown at the Wexner Center for the Arts. The Gagosian Gallery in Hong Kong showed his work in 2012. In 2016 as well as in 2018 his work was presented at  Alon Segev Gallery in Tel Aviv.

Selected exhibitions 
Morrison has exhibited his works worldwide, including:

 Gagosian Gallery, Beverly Hills, CA, USA 2008
 Gagosian Gallery, New York, NY, USA 2011
 Almine Rech Gallery, Brussels, Belgium 2012
 Gagosian Gallery, Hong Kong, China 2012
 Almine Rech Gallery, Paris, France 2014
 Almine Rech Gallery, London, UK 2015
 Alon Segev Gallery, Tel-Aviv, Israel 2016
 Alon Segev Gallery, Tel-Aviv, Israel 2018

References 



1976 births
Artists from Los Angeles
21st-century American sculptors
21st-century American male artists
American male sculptors
Living people
Artists from Seattle
Claremont Graduate University alumni
Sculptors from California
Sculptors from Washington (state)